Hojjatabad (also Romanized as Ḩojjatābād) is a village in Eresk Rural District, Eresk District, Boshruyeh County, South Khorasan Province, Iran. At the 2006 census, its population was 72, in 22 families.

References 

Populated places in Boshruyeh County